Luže may refer to places:

Luže (Chrudim District), a town in the Czech Republic
Luže, Šenčur, a settlement in Slovenia